Anthony Frederick Augustus Sandys (born Antonio Frederic Augustus Sands; 1 May 1829 – 25 June 1904), usually known as Frederick Sandys, was a British painter, illustrator, and draughtsman, associated with the Pre-Raphaelites. He was also associated with the Norwich School of painters.

Biography

Artistic studies
Frederick Sandys was born in Norwich, and received his earliest lessons in art from his father, Anthony Sands, who was himself a painter. His early studies show that he had a natural gift for careful and beautiful drawing. He was educated at Norwich School and later attended the Norwich School of Design in 1846. In the same and next year his talent was recognized by the Royal Society of Arts.

Personal relationships
Sandys married Georgiana Creed, but this marriage only lasted three years, although they never divorced. He had a long affair with the Romany woman Keomi Gray, who sat as a model both for him and Dante Gabriel Rossetti, and perhaps also for Simeon Solomon. He and Gray had two daughters and two sons.

In 1862 Sandys met actress Mary Emma Jones, known as Miss Clive, when she modeled for The Magdalen, now owned by the Norwich Castle Museum. A relationship developed between the two; he became devoted to her, taking her as his common-law wife for the rest of his life. She gave birth to a large number of children, 10 of whom were raised under the name of Neville and survived after Sandys's death. She appears in paintings such as Sandys Love's Shadow and his 1867 work Proud Maisie, which was inspired by Mary—so much so that he made at least 11 versions by 1904.

Sandys influenced his younger sister, Emma Sandys (1843–1877), whose works were mainly portraits of children and of young women, often in period or medieval clothing.

He died in Kensington in west London in 1904.

Works

Early work

Sandys displayed great skills as a draughtsman, achieving recognition with his print The Nightmare (1857), parodying John Everett Millais's Sir Isumbras at the Ford. The caricaturist turned the horse of Sir Isumbras into a laughing donkey labelled "J. R., Oxon.", understood as a reference to John Ruskin. Upon the donkey was seated Millais himself, in the character of the knight, with Rossetti and Holman Hunt replacing the two children, one before and one behind. The caricature, produced using the new autographic lithographic process, caused a lot of talk about who the artist might be and ultimately introduced Sandys to the London art community.
 
Rossetti and Sandys became close friends, and from May 1866 to July 1867, Sandys lived with Rossetti at 16, Cheyne Walk, Chelsea. Sandys's works were profoundly influenced by those of Rossetti. He focused mainly on mythological subjects and portraits.

Drawings and illustration

Wood-engravings
Some of the first introductions to Pre-Raphaelite teachings emerged in magazines, such as  Once a Week, the Cornhill Magazine, Good Words and Sunday Magazine. Sandys began drawing in the 1860s for Once a Week, the Cornhill Magazine, Good Words and other periodicals, his work influenced by Albrecht Dürer, Ambrosius Holbein, and Alfred Rethel.  Sandys made a total of 26 between 1859 and 1866, but each was a fine representation of this genre, faithfully engraved by professional wood-engravers, including the Dalziel brothers and Joseph Swain, and they are worthy of the collector's portfolio. For the engravers to be successful in carving the intricate illustrations onto wood, they needed to start with a detailed, clear design from the artist. Sandys had an eye and talent for exacting detail, an intention to accurately reflect the subject, revealed in the quality of his works, equally impressive for its technical detail as for its imaginative point of view.

Sandys's The Death of King Warwulf is an example of his ability to create drawings that translated well for the engravings.  Swirling shapes of flames, the curve of the boat, its sail and the king's clothes that surround him create a feeling of movement. The focal point is the king's bowed head.

His last woodcut was on the subject of Danaë in the Brazen Chamber. It was engraved by Swain for Once A Week but suppressed by the publication's editor, despite Sandys having the support of the magazine's publishers, on the grounds that it was too sensuous.

He drew only in the magazines. No books illustrated by him can be traced. So his exquisite draughtsmanship has to be sought for in the old bound-up periodical volumes which are now hunted by collectors, or in publications such as Dalziels' Bible Gallery and the Cornhill Gallery and books of drawings, with verses attached to them, made to lie upon the drawing-room tables of those who had for the most part no idea of their merits.

Chalk drawings of lettered men
He made a number of chalk drawings of famous men of letters, including Tennyson, Browning, Matthew Arnold, and James Russell Lowell.

Studies for paintings
Study for Vivien depicts Sandys's lover, Keomi Gray, as Vivien of Tennyson's poem Idylls of the King.  In the poem Vivien is the femme fatale in the story of King Arthur who used her looks to seduce Merlin to learn his secrets. Sandys had previously used tales from King Arthur as inspiration for his work, such as King Pelles' Daughter.  He was drawn to stories of women who "seduce, entrap and destroy men, such as Helen of Troy, Morgan Le Fay and Medea." Sandys portrays Vivien as a beautiful, self-assured woman. The apple placed in front of her may refer to the story of Adam and Eve.

Study for Autumn, made in 1860, is one of the many studies Sandys made before painting Autumn and provides evidence of Sandys's skill as a draughtsman.  He captures minute details, such as the soldier's uniform and the plants and flowers.  The study is much like the finished painting, except that the ginger jar is in the foreground.

Paintings

Early in the 1860s he began to exhibit the paintings which set the seal upon his fame. The best known of these are Vivien (1863), Morgan le Fay (1864), Cassandra and Medea (1868).

Sandys never became a popular painter. He painted little, and the dominant influence upon his art was the influence exercised by lofty conceptions of tragic power. There was in it a sombre intensity and an almost stern beauty which lifted it far above the ideals of the crowd. The Scandinavian Sagas and Le Morte d'Arthur gave him subjects after his own heart, and The Valkyrie and Morgan le Fay represent some of his best work.

See also
Emma Sandys – painter, his sister
List of Pre-Raphaelite paintings – including the work of Anthony Frederick Augustus Sandys.

References

Further reading

External links

Works by Frederick Sandys in the Norfolk Museums Collections
Birmingham Museums & Art Gallery's Pre-Raphaelite Online Resource  Large online collection of works by Frederick Sandys
Frederick Sandys at Artcylopaedia.
Frederick Sandys & the Pre-Raphaelites at Norwich Castle Museum & Art Gallery.

1829 births
1904 deaths
19th-century British painters
British male painters
20th-century British painters
English illustrators
Pre-Raphaelite painters
People educated at Norwich School
Alumni of Norwich University of the Arts
Artists from Norwich
Burials at Brompton Cemetery
Pre-Raphaelite illustrators
19th-century British male artists
20th-century British male artists